Pinela is a civil parish in the municipality of Bragança, Portugal. The population in 2011 was 219, in an area of 22.65 km².

References

Parishes of Bragança, Portugal